Gerbaud may refer to:

 Gerbold, bishop of Bayeux of the seventh century
 Gerebald, bishop of Châlon of the ninth century
 Gerbald, bishop of Liège of the Prince-Bishopric of Liège
  (Gerbaud, Gerwald)

There are numerous variants on this Germanic name, originally Gere-bold.

Gerbeaud 

 Emil Gerbeaud
 Café Gerbeaud

Gerbeau 

 Hubert Gerbeau

See also 
 Gerbert (disambiguation)

French masculine given names
Germanic masculine given names